Orsha is an urban locality (an urban-type settlement) in Kalininsky District of Tver Oblast, Russia, located northeast of the city of Tver, on the right bank of the Orsha River, and surrounded by swamps. Population:

History
Orsha was founded in 1955, when peat extraction started. Until 1994, the Orshinskoye-1 Peat Extraction Plant was the main employer in the settlement, but then it decayed and eventually was closed. It is currently defunct. In 1974, Orsha was granted urban-type settlement status.

Economy

Industry
The industry of Orsha is based on peat and timber production.

Transportation
Orsha is connected by a road with Tver.

References

Notes

Sources

Urban-type settlements in Tver Oblast